Hardy Billington (born 1952 or 1953) is an American politician. He is a member of the Missouri House of Representatives from the 152nd District, serving since 2019. He is a member of the Republican party.

References

Living people
1950s births
Republican Party members of the Missouri House of Representatives
21st-century American politicians